Beli Grič is a small settlement in the Municipality of Mokronog-Trebelno in southeastern Slovenia. The area is part of the historical region of Lower Carniola. The municipality is now included in the Southeast Slovenia Statistical Region.

Name
The name of the settlement was changed from Sveti Križ (literally, 'Holy Cross') to Beli Grič (literally, 'white hill') in 1955. The name was changed on the basis of the 1948 Law on Names of Settlements and Designations of Squares, Streets, and Buildings as part of efforts by Slovenia's postwar communist government to remove religious elements from toponyms. In the past the German name was Heiligenkreuz.

Church

The local church in the settlement is dedicated to the Holy Cross and belongs to the Parish of Mokronog. It was first mentioned in written documents dating to 1526 and was extended in the 17th century and restyled in the Baroque in the 18th century.

References

External links

Beli Grič on Geopedia

Populated places in the Municipality of Mokronog-Trebelno